Schefflera curranii is a species of plant in the family Araliaceae. It is endemic to the Philippines.

References

Endemic flora of the Philippines
curranii
Taxonomy articles created by Polbot
Taxa named by Elmer Drew Merrill

Critically endangered flora of Asia